Julian Rix (1850–1903) was an American landscape artist.

Biography
A native of Vermont, he lived in California where his artwork caught the attention of silk tycoon, William Ryle, of Paterson, New Jersey.  Ryle financed Rix's work and many of his portraits hang in the halls of Lambert Castle in Paterson, New Jersey.

Rix died at his home in New York City in 1903.

References

External links
 

19th-century American painters
19th-century American male artists
American male painters
20th-century American painters
20th-century American male artists
1850 births
1903 deaths
Burials at Cedar Lawn Cemetery
Painters from Vermont
Painters from California
American landscape painters